Academic Challenge may refer to:

 Academic Challenge (Ohio), a high school quiz program throughout Ohio
 YSU Academic Challenge, a high school and middle school quiz show
 Commissioner's Academic Challenge, a Florida public high school competition

See also 
 Academic Games